Chuvash Autonomous Oblast (Chuvash labor commune) (Chăwash avtonomi oblaşӗ) was an autonomous oblast from June 24, 1920 until April 21, 1925 when the oblast become part of the Chuvash Autonomous Republic.  The oblast included a number of counties of the former Kazan and Simbirsk provinces.

History
By the beginning of 1920 under the impact of the Russian Soviet Federative Socialist Republic, a large part of the Chuvash workers determined the idea to raise a central government to issue and grant his people an autonomous status as a special administrative unit.  On January 3, 1920, Chuvash People's Commissariat Department presented to the board of the Council of People's Commissars a preliminary report on the special administrative unit. In June, the Political Bureau of the Central Committee of the Russian Communist Party (bolsheviks) discussed the issue and recognized the need of Tsivilsky, Cheboksary, and Yadrinsky counties to form an administrative unit of Chuvash people. On June 22, 1920, the Politburo of the Central Committee of the Communist Party of the Soviet Union approved the autonomy of the Chuvash people and their Chuvash Autonomous Oblast, which was adopted on June 24, 1920 by decree signed by the Chairman of the Council of People's Commissars Vladimir Lenin, the Chairman of the Central Executive Committee of the All-Russian Congress of Soviets Mikhail Kalinin, and the Secretary of the Central Executive Committee Avel Enukidze.

See also
First Secretary of the Chuvash Communist Party

References

External links

Даниил Эльмень - герой или аутсайдер чувашской истории?

1920 establishments in Russia
1925 disestablishments in the Soviet Union
Autonomous oblasts of the Soviet Union
States and territories established in 1920
States and territories disestablished in 1925
History of Chuvashia